Dungannon is a town in Scott County, Virginia, United States. The population was 332 at the 2010 census. It was named after the town of Dungannon in County Tyrone, Northern Ireland.

Dungannon is part of the Kingsport–Bristol (TN)–Bristol (VA) Metropolitan Statistical Area, which is a component of the Johnson City–Kingsport–Bristol, TN-VA Combined Statistical Area – commonly known as the "Tri-Cities" region.

History
The Flanary Archeological Site was listed on the National Register of Historic Places in 1983.

Geography
Dungannon is located at  (36.827894, -82.468828).

Demographics

At the 2000 census there were 317 people, 132 households, and 90 families living in the town. The population density was 869.5 people per square mile (340.0/km²). There were 149 housing units at an average density of 408.7 per square mile (159.8/km²).  The racial makeup of the town is 100.00% White.
Of the 132 households 33.3% had children under the age of 18 living with them, 56.8% were married couples living together, 10.6% had a female householder with no husband present, and 31.1% were non-families. 28.0% of households were one person and 17.4% were one person aged 65 or older. The average household size was 2.40 and the average family size was 2.96.

The age distribution was 24.0% under the age of 18, 9.8% from 18 to 24, 27.1% from 25 to 44, 25.2% from 45 to 64, and 13.9% 65 or older. The median age was 39 years. For every 100 females there were 89.8 males. For every 100 females age 18 and over, there were 89.8 males.

The median household income was $21,406 and the median family income  was $27,292. Males had a median income of $26,042 versus $16,389 for females. The per capita income for the town was $12,200. About 21.3% of families and 25.1% of the population were below the line of poverty, including 37.3% of those under age 18 and 7.3% of those age 65 or over.

Notable person
 Dave Hillman, former Major League Baseball player for the Chicago Cubs and New York Mets

Notable businesses
 For over 85 years, S.I. Osborne Hardware Company, Inc., has been operating as a full-service hardware store, serving Dungannon and the surrounding area. The store sells general hardware, ranging from plumbing supplies and paint, nails and lumber to larger items such as Frigidaire appliances, plus lawn and gardening supplies.

References

External links
 Town website
 Dungannon Development Commission
 Visit Dungannon, Virginia

Towns in Scott County, Virginia